Crossdale is a rural locality in the Somerset Region, Queensland, Australia.

Geography 
Part of the western boundary of Crossdale follows the Stanley River. Some of the waters of Somerset Dam are within the locality.  Crossdale is relatively large and has a diverse topography.  In the north east the elevations rises along the north of the D'Aguilar Range.  Little Mount Brisbane is located close to the Somerset Dam wall.  In the south another hilly area reaches heights greater than 300 m around McKey Hill.  A majority of the locality is devoid of vegetation although the slopes remain covered by bushland.

The north-western part of the locality is not accessible to the public, being almost entirely surrounded by the waters of Lake Wivenhoe, the impoundment of the Brisbane River by Wivenhoe Dam. Prior to the construction of the dam, this area was known as Mount Esk Pocket.

History 
Mount Esk Pocket State School opened on 19 July 1911. It closed in December 1967. It was located on the north-eastern corner of the junction of two now-unnamed roads.

In the 2011 census, Crossdale had a population of 190 people.

Education 
There are no schools in Crossdale. The nearest primary schools are Toogoolawah State School in Toogoolawah to the west and Fernvale State School in Fernvale to the south-west. The nearest secondary schools are Toogoolawah State High School in Toogoolawah to the west and Kilcoy State High School in Kilcoy to the north.

Facilities

Bryden-Fairview Cemetery is at 2959 Wivenhoe Somerset Road down a  access road.

References

Suburbs of Somerset Region
Localities in Queensland